Une Année is the first full-length studio album by South Korean girl group Apink. It was released on May 9, 2012, It would mark the final release for member Yookyung before her  departure of Apink. The title track, "Hush", was used to promote the album.

Background and composition

Two of the songs from the album, "I Got You" and "Sky High", were a collaboration with Joker. The group also worked with Shinsadong Tiger, Super Changddai, and Kim Geonwoo.

Singles 
The first single from the album, "April 19th", was released digitally on April 19, 2012.

The album's title track, "Hush", a dance-pop song, was released on May 9, 2012. The song's music video was released on May 8, and a dance practice music video was released on May 14. A Japanese version of "Hush" was later included as a B-side on Apink's Japanese single, "Mr. Chu". The promotions for "Hush" started on May 10, 2012, on Mnet's M! Countdown.

The third single, "Bubibu", was released digitally on July 6, 2012. The single was chosen through an online poll that the group ran through Mnet's website where they asked fans to choose the track for their follow-up promotions. The single version is a remix of the album version.
The fourth single, "Cat", was released three days after the third single "Bubibu".

Track listing

Charts

Sales and certifications

References

External links
 

Apink albums
2012 albums
Korean-language albums
Cube Entertainment albums
Stone Music Entertainment albums
Kakao M albums